William Henry Smythe (October 24, 1904 – August 28, 1980) was a pitcher in Major League Baseball. He pitched from 1929 to 1934.

He later managed the Montreal Royals in the International League for part of the 1936 season.

External links

1904 births
1980 deaths
Baseball players from Augusta, Georgia
Major League Baseball pitchers
Brooklyn Dodgers players
Philadelphia Phillies players
New York Yankees players
Lakeland Highlanders players
Augusta Tygers players
Macon Peaches players
Asheville Tourists players
Winston-Salem Twins players
Baltimore Orioles (IL) players
Montreal Royals managers
Montreal Royals players
Minneapolis Millers (baseball) players
Knoxville Smokies players
Charlotte Hornets (baseball) players
Augusta Tigers players